Zone One Tondo Organization (ZOTO), also known as Samahan ng Mamamayan-ZOTO is a federation of urban poor community groups based in relocation sites and areas for demolition in the Philippines.  Established in October 20, 1970, ZOTO is the oldest urban poor organization in the Philippines.

As the name implies, ZOTO started in Tondo, Manila, and eventually spread throughout the country when their Tondo-based members were relocated to different cities and provinces.  As of today, ZOTO has established chapters in Malabon, Caloocan, Cavite, Bulacan, and Pampanga.

References

Organizations established in 1970
Organizations based in Metro Manila
Poverty-related organizations
Tondo, Manila